The National Union for Democracy and Development is a political party in Burkina Faso (former Upper Volta). A part of the country's opposition, the UNDD is currently led by Hermann Yaméogo, son of the country's first president, Maurice Yaméogo.

References

External links
UNDD (in French)

Political parties in Burkina Faso